Harold R. McCluskey (July 12, 1912 – August 17, 1987) was a chemical operations technician at the Hanford Plutonium Finishing Plant located in Washington State who is known for having survived, on August 30, 1976, exposure to the highest dose of radiation from americium ever recorded. He became known as the 'Atomic Man'.

Accident
On August 30, 1976, McCluskey, who lived in Prosser, Washington, then 64, was exposed to 500 times the occupational standard for americium-241, a plutonium byproduct, as the result of an accident in a glove box resulting in an explosion. As nitric acid was added to a column containing an ion-exchange resin and americium, the chemicals exploded, blowing out "pieces of glass and plastic" (plexiglass) from the glove box. Harold McCluskey was exposed to at least 37 MBq of americium-241 and nitric acid. He was hit on the right side by a mixture of nitric acid, broken glass, americium and ion exchange resin.

Treatment
McCluskey was helped from the room, had his clothing removed and was washed with water at the scene. He was transferred to a decontamination facility where he was washed again and given a dose of one gram of Ca-DTPA on arrival. For the first week he had two baths per day, then he had one bath per day for two months. For the first five days he was treated with the calcium complex of DTPA and then after that for four years he was treated with a total of 583 grams of the zinc complex of DTPA. The treatment reduced the systemic deposition to 500 kBq instead of the 19 MBq which he would otherwise have retained inside his body.

Because of risk of exposure to other individuals, McCluskey was placed in isolation in the Hanford Emergency Decontamination Facility for five months and underwent chelation therapy using DTPA by Dr. Bryce Breitenstein. By 1977, his body's radiation count had fallen by about 80%. When McCluskey returned home, friends and church members avoided him. His minister finally had to tell people it was safe to be around him.

Afterwards
Although McCluskey largely avoided the media, Breitenstein said McCluskey sometimes accompanied him when he gave lectures on the case. "He really wanted people to know what happened as long as it is rationally presented," Breitenstein said. Several times after the explosion, McCluskey spoke in favor of developing nuclear power, saying he saw his injuries as the result of "purely an industrial accident."

Death
He died on August 17, 1987, of coronary artery disease. He had this disease before the accident, and a post mortem examination found no signs of cancer. At the time of his death he had 55 kBq of americium in his soft tissues (27.9 kBq in the liver), 470 kBq in the mineral surfaces of the bones, and 20 kBq in his bone marrow.

References

Further reading
 Health Physics,  October 1983 - Volume 45 - Issue 4 -  dedicated to the accident in 1983 (Health Physics Society)
 Workers Demolish McCluskey Room at Hanford (KGMI)

1912 births
1987 deaths
Victims of radiological poisoning
People from Prosser, Washington
Hanford Site people
Americium